John Leek (died 1369) was a Canon of Windsor from 1362 to 1369

Career

He was appointed:
Dean in the King's Chapel 
Rector of Yardley Hastings (diocese of Lincoln) 1358
Rector of All Saints Church, Loughborough 1349 – 1353 and 1358 - 1369
Rector of Little Gelham (or Yeldham) (diocese of London) 
Prebendary of Somerley in Chichester until 1366

He was appointed to the third stall in St George's Chapel, Windsor Castle in 1362 and held the canonry until 1369.

Notes 

1369 deaths
Canons of Windsor
Year of birth unknown